Nihal Zoysa (born 9 April 1970) is a Sri Lankan former cricketer. He played in 141 first-class and 54 List A matches between 1988/89 and 2008/09. He made his Twenty20 debut on 17 August 2004, for Sri Lanka Police Sports Club in the 2004 SLC Twenty20 Tournament.

References

External links
 

1970 births
Living people
Sri Lankan cricketers
Burgher Recreation Club cricketers
Sri Lanka Police Sports Club cricketers
Cricketers from Colombo